Saint-Victor-de-Beauce Aerodrome  is located  southeast of Saint-Victor, Quebec, Canada.

References

Registered aerodromes in Chaudière-Appalaches